Huang Yaoshi is a fictional character in the wuxia novel The Legend of the Condor Heroes and its sequel, The Return of the Condor Heroes, by Jin Yong. He is one of the Five Greats of the wulin (martial artists' community) during the Song dynasty, alongside Wang Chongyang, Hong Qigong, Ouyang Feng and Duan Zhixing. He is nicknamed "Eastern Heretic" for being an unorthodox radical who behaves as he wishes without showing any regard for formalities or moral ethics. He loathes the dogma of traditional rites in Chinese society and admires only genuine honour and pure love. As such, he is often regarded by his contemporaries as a cultural heretic. His nickname may be translated to "Eastern Evil" because the character xié in his nickname also refers to "evil" and "unorthodoxy" in jianghu terminology.

Fictional character biography

Background 
Huang Yaoshi is the master of Peach Blossom Island and one of the Five Greats, the five most powerful martial artists in the jianghu (martial artists' community). Apart from being a formidable fighter, he is well-versed in other fields such as military strategy, music and divination. Known to be a loner who harbours "heretical" views on traditional Chinese social norms, he is nicknamed "Eastern Heretic" and his eccentric personality makes him a much dreaded figure in the jianghu. He is married to Feng Heng, who died shortly after giving birth to their daughter, Huang Rong, the female lead character in the novel. He has six apprentices: Chen Xuanfeng, Mei Chaofeng, Qu Lingfeng, Wu Mianfeng and Feng Mofeng.

The Legend of the Condor Heroes 
Huang Yaoshi makes his first appearance in the middle of the novel when he is searching for Huang Rong, who has run away from home after a quarrel with her father. He meets Guo Jing, whom his daughter is romantically attracted to, and learns about the fates of his six apprentices. Chen Xuanfeng had been killed by Guo Jing; Mei Chaofeng has been blinded but still retains her fighting prowess; Qu Lingfeng and Wu Mianfeng are dead; Feng Mofeng is missing; and Lu Chengfeng, now a cripple, has settled in a manor on Lake Tai. He later accepts Qu Lingfeng's daughter Shagu and Lu Chengfeng's son Lu Guanying as his grand-apprentices.

As the story progresses, Guo Jing visits Peach Blossom Island with his master Hong Qigong to compete for Huang Rong's hand-in-marriage against Ouyang Ke, Ouyang Feng's nephew. Guo Jing also meets Zhou Botong, who has been in a 15-year-long conflict with Huang Yaoshi over the Nine Yin Manual. Huang Yaoshi sets a series of tests for Guo Jing and Ouyang Ke. Guo Jing wins, much to Huang Yaoshi's chagrin because he dislikes Guo Jing, who is slow in learning and appears dumb. However, he ultimately gives his blessings to his daughter and Guo Jing after Guo Jing proves his worth and shows that he truly loves Huang Rong.

The Return of the Condor Heroes 
Huang Yaoshi makes several brief appearances in the sequel. He rescues Cheng Ying from Li Mochou and accepts the child as his apprentice. He also develops a special bond with Yang Guo, the protagonist, as both of them share the same distaste for the social norms of their time, and he teaches Yang Guo two of his most powerful skills. Huang Yaoshi also joins his daughter and son-in-law in defending the city of Xiangyang from Mongol invaders. At the end of the novel, he retains his position as the "Eastern Heretic" of the new Five Greats.

Skills 
Unlike most of the other top-level masters in his era, Huang Yaoshi has a wide variety of martial skills, reflecting his eclectic approach to combat. 

 Jade Waves Palm
 Complex Five Turns is a palm technique based on the Qi Men Dun Jia.
 Holy Turtle Steps is a type of qinggong.
 Fallen Hero Divine Sword Palm
 Whirlwind Leaves Sweeping Leg
 Orchid Acupuncture Point Brushing Hand is an acupuncture point sealing technique.
 Finger Flicking Skill is a technique involving the channelling of a great amount of inner energy into a single finger and releasing it with a precise amount of control. It can be used to propel objects with both force and accuracy.
 Jade Flute Swordplay is a swordplay technique primarily focused on attacking an opponent's acupuncture points
 Jade Leaking Silver Pushing Sword
 Three Fork and Three Palm Styles is a six styles skill involving the use of the cha. The moves are simple in nature and require great strength. Huang Yaoshi teaches Shagu this skill for self-defence.

In film and television 
Notable actors who have portrayed Huang Yaoshi in films and television series include Shih Kien (1958), Michael Chan (1976), Kenneth Tsang (1983), David Chiang (1993), Leslie Cheung (1993), Tony Leung Ka-fai (1994), Felix Lok (1994), Chen Shucheng (1998), Yu Chenghui (2006), Anthony Wong (2008), Christopher Lee (2014), Michael Miu (2017) and Eddie Kwan (2021).

Trivia
Huang Yao-shi Was Used The English name Known As the Yellow Medicine.

Notes

References 
 Tan, Xianmao (2005). Huang Yaoshi: The Practitioner of Eccentric Swordsmanship. In Rankings of Jin Yong's Characters. Chinese Agricultural Press.  

The Legend of the Condor Heroes
The Return of the Condor Heroes
Condor Trilogy
Jin Yong characters
Fictional wushu practitioners
Literary characters introduced in 1959
Characters in novels of the 20th century
Fictional Song dynasty people
Fictional Han people
Fictional traditional Chinese medicine practitioners